Nigeria, officially the Federal Republic of Nigeria, is a country in West Africa. It is situated between the Sahel to the north and the Gulf of Guinea to the south in the Atlantic Ocean. Nigeria borders Niger in the north, Chad in the northeast, Cameroon in the east, and Benin in the west. Nigeria is a federal republic comprising 36 states and the Federal Capital Territory, where the capital, Abuja, is located. The largest city in Nigeria is Lagos, one of the largest metropolitan areas in the world and the second-largest in Africa.

Nigeria has been home to several indigenous pre-colonial states and kingdoms since the second millennium BC, with the Nok civilization in the 15th century BC marking the first internal unification in the country. The modern state originated with British colonialization in the 19th century, taking its present territorial shape with the merging of the Southern Nigeria Protectorate and Northern Nigeria Protectorate in 1914 by Lord Lugard. The British set up administrative and legal structures while practising indirect rule through traditional chiefdoms in the Nigeria region. Nigeria became a formally independent federation on 1 October 1960. It experienced a civil war from 1967 to 1970, followed by a succession of military dictatorships and democratically elected civilian governments until achieving a stable democracy in the 1999 presidential election. The 2015 general election was the first time an incumbent president failed to be re-elected.

Nigeria is a multinational state inhabited by more than 250 ethnic groups speaking 500 distinct languages, all identifying with a wide variety of cultures. The three largest ethnic groups are the Hausa in the north, Yoruba in the west, and Igbo in the east, together constituting over 60% of the total population. The official language is English, chosen to facilitate linguistic unity at the national level. Nigeria's constitution ensures freedom of religion and it is home to some of the world's largest Muslim and Christian populations. Nigeria is divided roughly in half between Muslims, who live mostly in the north, and Christians, who live mostly in the south; indigenous religions, such as those native to the Igbo and Yoruba ethnicities, are in the minority.

Nigeria is a regional power in Africa and a middle and emerging power in international affairs. Nigeria's economy is the largest in Africa, the 31st-largest in the world by nominal GDP, and 26th-largest by PPP. Nigeria is often referred to as the Giant of Africa owing to its large population and economy and is considered to be an emerging market by the World Bank. However, the country ranks very low in the Human Development Index and remains one of the most corrupt nations in the world. Nigeria is a founding member of the African Union and a member of many international organizations, including the United Nations, the Commonwealth of Nations, NAM, the Economic Community of West African States, Organisation of Islamic Cooperation and OPEC. It is also a member of the informal MINT group of countries and is one of the Next Eleven economies.

Etymology 

The name Nigeria was taken from the Niger River running through the country. This name was coined on 8 January 1897, by the British journalist Flora Shaw, who later married Frederick Lugard, a British colonial administrator. The neighbouring Republic of Niger takes its name from the same river. The origin of the name Niger, which originally applied to only the middle reaches of the Niger River, is uncertain. The word is likely an alteration of the Tuareg name egerew n-igerewen used by inhabitants along the middle reaches of the river around Timbuktu before 19th-century European colonialism.

History

Prehistory and ancient history (before 1500) 

Kainji Dam excavations showed ironworking by the 2nd century BC. The transition from Neolithic times to the Iron Age was accomplished without intermediate bronze production. Others believe or suggest the technology moved west from the Nile Valley, although the Iron Age in the Niger River valley and the forest region appears to predate the introduction of metallurgy in the upper savanna by more than 800 years.

The Nok civilization of Nigeria thrived between 1,500 BC and AD 200. It produced life-sized terracotta figures that are some of the earliest known sculptures in Sub-Saharan Africa and smelted iron by about 550 BC and possibly a few centuries earlier. Evidence of iron smelting has also been excavated at sites in the Nsukka region of southeast Nigeria: dating to 2000 BC at the site of Lejja and to 750 BC and at the site of Opi.

The Kano Chronicle highlights an ancient history dating to around 999 AD of the Hausa Sahelian city-state of Kano, with other major Hausa cities (or Hausa Bakwai) of Daura, Hadeija, Kano, Katsina, Zazzau, Rano, and Gobir all having recorded histories dating back to the 10th century. With the spread of Islam from the 7th century AD, the area became known as Sudan or as Bilad Al Sudan (English: Land of the Blacks; Arabic: بلاد السودان). Since the populations were partially affiliated with the Arab Muslim culture of North Africa, they began trans-Saharan trade and were referred to by the Arabic speakers as Al-Sudan (meaning "The Blacks") as they were considered an extended part of the Muslim world. There are early historical references by medieval Arab and Muslim historians and geographers which refer to the Kanem-Bornu Empire as the region's major centre for Islamic civilization.

The Kingdom of Nri of the Igbo people consolidated in the 10th century and continued until it lost its sovereignty to the British in 1911. Nri was ruled by the Eze Nri, and the city of Nri is considered to be the foundation of Igbo culture. Nri and Aguleri, where the Igbo creation myth originates, are in the territory of the Umeuri clan. Members of the clan trace their lineages back to the patriarchal king-figure Eri. In West Africa, the oldest bronzes made using the lost wax process were from Igbo-Ukwu, a city under Nri influence.

The Yoruba kingdoms of Ife and Oyo in southwestern Nigeria became prominent in the 12th and 14th centuries, respectively. The oldest signs of human settlement at Ife's current site date back to the 9th century, and its material culture includes terracotta and bronze figures.

Pre-colonial era (1500–1850) 

In the 16th century, Portuguese explorers were the first Europeans to begin important, direct trade with the peoples of southern Nigeria, at the port they named Lagos (formerly Eko) and in Calabar along the region Slave Coast. Europeans traded goods with peoples at the coast; coastal trade with Europeans also marked the beginnings of the Atlantic slave trade. The port of Calabar on the historical Bight of Biafra (now commonly referred to as the Bight of Bonny) became one of the largest slave-trading posts in West Africa in the era of the Atlantic slave trade. Other major slaving ports in Nigeria were located in Badagry, Lagos on the Bight of Benin, and Bonny Island on the Bight of Biafra. The majority of those enslaved and taken to these ports were captured in raids and wars. Usually, the captives were taken back to the conquerors' territory as forced labour; after time, they were sometimes acculturated and absorbed into the conquerors' society. Slave routes were established throughout Nigeria linking the hinterland areas with the major coastal ports. Some of the more prolific slave-trading kingdoms who participated in the Atlantic slave trade were linked with the Edo's Benin Empire in the south, Oyo Empire in the southwest, and the Aro Confederacy in the southeast. Benin's power lasted between the 15th and 19th centuries. Oyo, at its territorial zenith in the late 17th to early 18th centuries, extended its influence from western Nigeria to modern-day Togo.In the north, the incessant fighting amongst the Hausa city-states and the decline of the Bornu Empire gave rise to the Fulani people gaining headway into the region. Until this point, the Fulani, a nomadic ethnic group, primarily traversed the semi-desert Sahelian region north of Sudan with cattle and avoided trade and intermingling with the Sudanic peoples. At the beginning of the 19th century, Usman dan Fodio led a successful jihad against the Hausa Kingdoms, founding the centralised Sokoto Caliphate. This empire, with Arabic as its official language, grew rapidly under his rule and that of his descendants, who sent out invading armies in every direction.

The vast landlocked empire connected the east with the western Sudan region and made inroads down south conquering parts of the Oyo Empire (modern-day Kwara), and advanced towards the Yoruba heartland of Ibadan, to reach the Atlantic Ocean. The territory controlled by the empire included much of modern-day northern and central Nigeria. The sultan sent out emirs to establish suzerainty over the conquered territories and promote Islamic civilization; the emirs in turn became increasingly rich and powerful through trade and slavery. By the 1890s, the largest slave population in the world, about two million, was concentrated in the territories of the Sokoto Caliphate. The use of slave labour was extensive, especially in agriculture. By the time of its break-up in 1903 into various European colonies, the Sokoto Caliphate was one of the largest pre-colonial African states.

A changing legal imperative (the outlawing of the Atlantic slave trade in 1807) and economic imperative (a desire for political and social stability) led most European powers to support the widespread cultivation of agricultural products, such as the palm, for use in European industry. European companies engaged in the Atlantic slave trade until it was outlawed in 1807 by Britain, which up until that point had been the second largest actor in the trade. The slave trade continued after the ban, as illegal smugglers purchased slaves along the coast from native slavers. Britain's West Africa Squadron sought to intercept the smugglers at sea. The rescued slaves were taken to Freetown, a colony in West Africa originally established by Lieutenant John Clarkson for the resettlement of slaves freed by Britain in North America after the American Revolutionary War.

British colonization (1850–1960) 

Britain intervened in the Lagos kingship power struggle by bombarding Lagos in 1851, deposing the slave-trade-friendly Oba Kosoko, helping to install the amenable Oba Akitoye and signing the Treaty between Great Britain and Lagos on 1January 1852. Britain annexed Lagos as a crown colony in August 1861 with the Lagos Treaty of Cession. British missionaries expanded their operations and travelled further inland. In 1864, Samuel Ajayi Crowther became the first African bishop of the Anglican Church.

In 1885, British claims to a West African sphere of influence received recognition from other European nations at the Berlin Conference. The following year, it chartered the Royal Niger Company under the leadership of Sir George Taubman Goldie. By the late 19th and early 20th centuries, the company had vastly succeeded in subjugating the independent southern kingdoms along the Niger River, the British conquered Benin in 1897, and, in the Anglo-Aro War (1901–1902), defeated other opponents. The defeat of these states opened up the Niger area to British rule. In 1900, the company's territory came under the direct control of the British government and established the Southern Nigeria Protectorate as a British protectorate and part of the British Empire, the foremost world power at the time.

By 1902, the British had begun plans to move north into the Sokoto Caliphate. British General Lord Frederick Lugard was tasked by the Colonial Office to implement the agenda. Lugard used rivalries between many of the emirs in the southern reach of the caliphate and the central Sokoto administration to prevent any defence as he worked towards the capital. As the British approached the city of Sokoto, Sultan Muhammadu Attahiru I organized a quick defence of the city and fought the advancing British-led forces. The British force quickly won, sending Attahiru I and thousands of followers on a Mahdist hijra. In the northeast, the decline of the Bornu Empire gave rise to the British-controlled Borno Emirate which established Abubakar Garbai of Borno as ruler.

In 1903, the British victory in the Battle of Kano gave them a logistical edge in pacifying the heartland of the Sokoto Caliphate and parts of the former Bornu Empire. On 13 March 1903, at the grand market square of Sokoto, the last vizier of the caliphate officially conceded to British rule. The British appointed Muhammadu Attahiru II as the new caliph. Lugard abolished the caliphate but retained the title sultan as a symbolic position in the newly organized Northern Nigeria Protectorate. This remnant became known as "Sokoto Sultanate Council". In June 1903, the British defeated the remaining forces of Attahiru. By 1906, resistance to British rule had ended.

On 1 January 1914, the British formally united the Southern Nigeria Protectorate and the Northern Nigeria Protectorate into the Colony and Protectorate of Nigeria. Administratively, Nigeria remained divided into the Northern and Southern Protectorates and Lagos Colony. Inhabitants of the southern region sustained more interaction, economic and cultural, with the British and other Europeans owing to the coastal economy. Following World War II, in response to the growth of Nigerian nationalism and demands for independence, successive constitutions legislated by the British government moved Nigeria toward self-government on a representative and increasingly federal basis. By the middle of the 20th century, a great wave for independence was sweeping across Africa.Christian missions established Western educational institutions in the protectorates. Under Britain's policy of indirect rule and validation of Islamic tradition, the Crown did not encourage the operation of Christian missions in the northern, Islamic part of the country. Some children of the southern elite went to Great Britain to pursue higher education. By independence in 1960, regional differences in modern educational access were marked. The legacy, though less pronounced, continues to the present day. Imbalances between north and south were expressed in Nigeria's political life as well. For instance, northern Nigeria did not outlaw slavery until 1936 whilst in other parts of Nigeria, slavery was abolished soon after colonialism.

First Republic, Civil War and coups (1960–1977) 

Nigeria gained a degree of self-rule in 1954, and full independence from the United Kingdom on 1 October 1960, as the Federation of Nigeria with Abubakar Tafawa Balewa as its prime minister, while retaining the British monarch, Elizabeth II, as nominal head of state and Queen of Nigeria. Azikiwe replaced the colonial governor-general in November 1960. At independence, the cultural and political differences were sharp among Nigeria's dominant ethnic groups: the Hausa in the north, Igbo in the east and Yoruba in the west. The Westminster system of government was retained, and thus the President's powers were generally ceremonial. The parliamentary system of government had Abubakar Tafawa Balewa as Prime Minister and Nnamdi Azikiwe as the ceremonial president.

The founding government was a coalition of conservative parties: the Northern People's Congress led by Sir Ahmadu Bello, a party dominated by Muslim northerners, and the Igbo and Christian-dominated National Council of Nigeria and the Cameroons led by Nnamdi Azikiwe. The opposition consisted of the comparatively liberal Action Group, which was largely dominated by the Yoruba and led by Obafemi Awolowo. An imbalance was created in the polity as the result of the 1961 plebiscite. Southern Cameroons opted to join the Republic of Cameroon while Northern Cameroons chose to join Nigeria. The northern part of the country became larger than the southern part.

The disequilibrium and perceived corruption of the electoral and political process led to two military coups in 1966. The first coup was in January 1966 and was led mostly by soldiers under Majors Emmanuel Ifeajuna (of the Igbo tribe) and Chukwuma Kaduna Nzeogwu (Northerner of Eastern extraction) and Adewale Ademoyega. The coup plotters succeeded in assassinating Sir Ahmadu Bello and Abubakar Tafawa Balewa alongside prominent leaders of the Northern Region and also Premier Samuel Akintola of the Western Region, but the coup plotters struggled to form a central government. Senate President Nwafor Orizu handed over government control to the Army, under the command of another Igbo officer, Major General Johnson Aguiyi-Ironsi. Later, the counter-coup of 1966, supported primarily by Northern military officers, facilitated the rise of Yakubu Gowon as military head of state. Tension rose between north and south; Igbos in northern cities suffered persecution and many fled to the Eastern Region. 

In May 1967, Governor of the Eastern Region Lt. Colonel Emeka Ojukwu declared the region independent from the federation as a state called the Republic of Biafra, as a result of the continuous and systematically planned attacks against Igbos and those of Eastern Extraction popularly known as 1966 pogroms. This declaration precipitated the Nigerian Civil War, which began as the official Nigerian government side attacked Biafra on 6 July 1967, at Garkem. The 30-month war, with a long siege of Biafra and its isolation from trade and supplies, ended in January 1970. Estimates of the number of dead in the former Eastern Region during the 30-month civil war range from one to three million. France, Egypt, the Soviet Union, Britain, Israel, and others were deeply involved in the civil war behind the scenes. Britain and the Soviet Union were the main military backers of the Nigerian government, with Nigeria utilizing air support from Egyptian pilots provided by Gamal Abdel Nasser, while France and Israel aided the Biafrans. The Congolese government, under President Joseph-Désiré Mobutu, took an early stand on the Biafran secession, voicing strong support for the Nigerian federal government and deploying thousands of troops to fight against the secessionists.
Following the war, Nigeria enjoyed an oil boom in the 1970s, during which the country joined OPEC and received huge oil revenues. Despite these revenues, the military government did little to improve the standard of living of the population, help small and medium businesses, or invest in infrastructure. As oil revenues fuelled the rise of federal subsidies to states, the federal government became the centre of political struggle and the threshold of power in the country. As oil production and revenue rose, the Nigerian government became increasingly dependent on oil revenues and international commodity markets for budgetary and economic concerns.

The coup in July 1975, led by Generals Shehu Musa Yar'Adua and Joseph Garba, ousted Gowon, who fled to Britain. The coup plotters wanted to replace Gowon's autocratic rule with a triumvirate of three brigadier generals whose decisions could be vetoed by a Supreme Military Council. For this triumvirate, they convinced General Murtala Muhammed to become military head of state, with General Olusegun Obasanjo as his second-in-command, and General Theophilus Danjuma as the third. Together, the triumvirate introduced austerity measures to stem inflation, established a Corrupt Practices Investigation Bureau, replaced all military governors with new officers, and launched "Operation Deadwood" through which they fired 11,000 officials from the civil service.

Colonel Buka Suka Dimka launched a February 1976 coup attempt, during which General Murtala Muhammed was assassinated. Dimka lacked widespread support among the military, and his coup failed, forcing him to flee. After the coup attempt, General Olusegun Obasanjo was appointed military head of state. As head of state, Obasanjo vowed to continue Murtala's policies. Aware of the danger of alienating northern Nigerians, Obasanjo brought General Shehu Yar'Adua as his replacement and second-in-command as Chief of Staff, Supreme Headquarters completing the military triumvirate, with Obasanjo as head of state and General Theophilus Danjuma as Chief of Army Staff, the three went on to re-establish control over the military regime and organized the military's transfer of power programme: states creation and national delimitation, local government reforms and the constitutional drafting committee for a new republic.

Second Republic and coups (1977–1992) 

In 1977, a constituent assembly was elected to draft a new constitution, which was published on 21 September 1978, when the ban on political activity was lifted. The military carefully planned the return to civilian rule putting in place measures to ensure that political parties had broader support than witnessed during the first republic. In 1979, five political parties competed in a series of elections in which Alhaji Shehu Shagari of the National Party of Nigeria (NPN) was elected president. All five parties won representation in the National Assembly. On 1 October 1979, Shehu Shagari was sworn in as the first President and Commander-in-Chief of the Federal Republic of Nigeria. Obasanjo peacefully transferred power to Shagari, becoming the first head of state in Nigerian history to willingly step down.

The Shagari government became viewed as corrupt by virtually all sectors of Nigerian society. In 1983, the inspectors of the state-owned Nigerian National Petroleum Corporation began to notice "the slow poisoning of the waters of this country". In August 1983 Shagari and the NPN were returned to power in a landslide victory, with a majority of seats in the National Assembly and control of 12 state governments. But the elections were marred by violence, and allegations of widespread vote-rigging and electoral malfeasance led to legal battles over the results. There were also uncertainties, such as in the first republic, that political leaders may be unable to govern properly.

The 1983 military coup d'état took place on New Year's Eve of that year. It was coordinated by key officers of the Nigerian military and led to the overthrow of the government and the installation of Major General Muhammadu Buhari as head of state. The military coup of Muhammadu Buhari shortly after the regime's re-election in 1984 was generally viewed as a positive development.

Third Republic and coups (1992–1998) 

In 1985, Ibrahim Babangida overthrew Buhari in a coup d'état. In 1986, Babangida established the Nigerian Political Bureau which made recommendations for the transition to the Third Nigerian Republic. In 1989, Babangida started making plans for the transition to the Third Nigerian Republic. Babangida survived the 1990 Nigerian coup d'état attempt, then postponed a promised return to democracy to 1992.

He legalized the formation of political parties and formed the two-party system with the Social Democratic Party and National Republican Convention ahead of the 1992 general elections. He urged all Nigerians to join either of the parties, which Chief Bola Ige referred to as "two leper hands." The two-party state had been a Political Bureau recommendation. After a census was conducted, the National Electoral Commission announced on 24 January 1992, that both legislative elections to a bicameral National Assembly and a presidential election would be held later that year. The adopted process advocated that any candidate needed to pass through adoption for all elective positions from the local government, state government and federal government.

The 1993 presidential election held on 12 June, was the first since the military coup of 1983. The results, though not officially declared by the National Electoral Commission, showed the duo of Moshood Abiola and Baba Gana Kingibe of the Social Democratic Party defeated Bashir Tofa and Sylvester Ugoh of the National Republican Convention by over 2.3 million votes. However, Babangida annulled the elections, leading to massive civilian protests that effectively shut down the country for weeks. In August 1993, Babangida finally kept his promise to relinquish power to a civilian government but not before appointing Ernest Shonekan head of the interim national government. Babangida's regime has been considered the most corrupt and responsible for creating a culture of corruption in Nigeria.

Shonekan's interim government, the shortest in the political history of the country, was overthrown in a coup d'état of 1993 led by General Sani Abacha, who used military force on a wide scale to suppress the continuing civilian unrest.

In 1995, the government hanged environmentalist Ken Saro-Wiwa on trumped-up charges in the deaths of four Ogoni elders, which caused Nigerian's suspension from the Commonwealth. Lawsuits under the American Alien Tort Statute against Royal Dutch Shell and Brian Anderson, the head of Shell's Nigerian operation, settled out of court with Shell continuing to deny liability. Several hundred million dollars in accounts traced to Abacha were discovered in 1999. The regime came to an end in 1998 when the dictator died in the villa. He looted money to offshore accounts in western European banks and defeated coup plots by arresting and bribing generals and politicians. His successor, General Abdulsalami Abubakar, adopted a new constitution on 5 May 1999, which provided for multiparty elections.

Fourth Republic (1999–present) 

Dictator Abacha died in 1998 under undignified circumstances at a "party". His successor, Abdulsalami Abubakar, adopted a constitution on 5 May 1999 that had been drafted ten years earlier and provided for free elections with several parties.

On 29 May 1999, Abubakar handed over power to the winner of the 1999 presidential election, former military ruler General Olusegun Obasanjo, as President of Nigeria. Obasanjo had been in prison under dictator Abacha. Obasanjo's election heralded the beginning of the Fourth Nigerian Republic, which lasts until today (2023). This ended a 39-year period of short-lived democracies, military coups and counter-coups.

The federalist structure of the 1999 constitution, with 37 states of roughly equal size, a Senate with three senators from each state, and a blocking minority of at least 13 states in the presidential election, must be considered a stroke of luck in view of the country's numerous ethnic groups and religious divisions. Each presidential candidate has since emphasised in their own interest to represent not only their own ethnic group / religion, but all Nigerians.

Although the elections that brought Obasanjo to power and allowed him to run for a second term in the 2003 presidential elections were condemned as unfree and unfair, Nigeria made significant progress in democratisation under Obasanjo. The fact that parliament was able to successfully deny the president a third term in office, despite his influence on the army and security forces, is evidence of the strengthened parliamentarism in Nigeria after 2000.

In October 2005, Nigeria and its Paris Club creditors reached an agreement under which Nigeria repurchased its debt at a discount of approximately 60%. Nigeria used part of its oil profits to pay the residual 40%, freeing up at least $1.15 billion annually for poverty reduction programmes. Nigeria made history in April 2006 by becoming the first African country to completely pay off its debt (estimated $30 billion) owed to the Paris Club.

In the 2007 general elections, Umaru Yar'Adua of the People's Democratic Party came to power. The international community, which had observed the Nigerian elections to promote a free and fair process, condemned these elections as seriously flawed. Outgoing President Olusegun Obasanjo acknowledged fraud and other "shortcomings" in the elections, but said the result was in line with opinion polls. In a nationally televised address in 2007, he added that if Nigerians did not like the victory of his handpicked successor, they had the option of voting again in four years' time. Yar'Adua's health would soon make this option pointless.
Yar'Adua died on 5 May 2010, and Vice President Goodluck Jonathan had been sworn in 3 months earlier to succeed Yar'Adua, who was seriously ill and receiving treatment abroad. Jonathan won the 2011 presidential election and the international media reported that, unlike previous elections, the polls went smoothly and with relatively little violence or electoral fraud. Jonathan's tenure includes the successful fight against Ebola and an economic recovery that made Nigeria the leading economic power in Africa. The Jonathan administration's film promotion of high-quality productions created Nigerias own commercially successful film industry, nicknamed "Nollywood".

On the other hand, the wave of terror by Boko Haram, which kidnapped 200 schoolgirls in Chibok in 2014, highlighted the impotence of the Nigerian state (about 100 of the girls are still missing in 2022). Above all, however, Jonathan's tenure stands for the misappropriation of state funds. 20 billion US dollars are said to have been lost to the Nigerian state as a result. The high level of corruption was a determining factor in the 2015 presidential election, in which "clean man" Muhammadu Buhari replaced incumbent Jonathan, who was running for re-election. This is (as of 2022) the only instance in the Fourth Republic where Nigerian voters refused to re-elect an incumbent president. Jonathans party, the PDP, lost power after 16 years of government.
Ahead of the general election of 2015, a merger of the biggest opposition parties – the Action Congress of Nigeria, the Congress for Progressive Change, the All Nigeria Peoples Party (a faction of the All Progressives Grand Alliance), and the new PDP (a faction of serving governors of the ruling People's Democratic Party) – formed the All Progressives Congress. Their candidate, former dictator Muhammadu Buhari—who had previously contested in the 2003, 2007, and 2011 presidential elections—won by over two million votes. Observers generally praised the election as being fair. In the 2019 presidential election, Buhari was re-elected for a second term in office defeating his closet rival Atiku Abubakar.

As a Nigerian response to the US Black Lives Matter movement, in 2020 mainly young Nigerians protested against police attacks. The Special Anti-Robbery Squad (SARS) was particularly criticised. The government disbanded the unit and promised to improve conditions. However, during a demonstration in October 2020, security forces shot dozens of people. The security situation eased slightly in 2022, when Boko Haram, whose militias terrorised Nigeria's north for years and devastated entire regions, largely disbanded. 40,000 Boko Haram fighters surrendered.

For the first time in the Fourth Republic, three candidates will face each other in the February 2023 presidential election: Bola Tinubu of the neoliberal ruling party All Progressives, Atiku Abubakar of the People's Democratic Party and Peter Obi of the Labour Party. Moreover, for the first time in the Fourth Republic, no officer or former military ruler is running for president. Peter Obi, previously the successful governor of Anambra State, is well ahead in opinion polls (as of October 2022). He appeals mainly to young, urban voters and has his core base in the Southeast.

On 27 February 2023, 2 days after the election, results were released by the Electoral Commission INEC indicating not the expected landslide victory for the Labour Party and its candidate Peter Obi, but that of his opponent Bola Tinubu. The EU observer mission criticised the elections as lacking transparency. Several hundred ballot boxes - in Labour strongholds - had been burnt or destroyed by armed criminals. Elsewhere, votes had been bought. The servers for the digital transmission of election results were not online for days. A telephone transmission of the election results was also not possible. Nevertheless, election results were published by the electoral commissions that contradicted the perceptions on the ground. Former President Obasanjo summarised the shortcomings of the 25 February election in a video message:"Until last Saturday night, February 25, 2023, the good and noble plan and preparation for the elections seemed to be going well. For the Independent National Electoral Commission (INEC), a lot of money was spent to introduce Bimodal Voter Accreditation System (BVAS), and the Server for immediate transmission of results from polling units. It is no secret that INEC officials, at operational level, have been allegedly compromised to make what should have worked not to work and to revert to manual transmission of results which is manipulated and the results doctored. The Chairman of INEC may claim ignorance but he cannot fold his hands and do nothing when he knows that election process has been corrupted and most of the results that are brought outside BVAS and Server are not true reflection of the will of Nigerians who have made their individual choice. 

(...) Let me appeal to the Chairman of INEC, if his hands are clean, to save Nigeria from the looming danger and disaster which is just waiting to happen. (...) He can do everything to rectify the errors of the last two days – no BVAS, no result to be acceptable; and no uploading through Server, no result to be acceptable. Whereas, BVAS and Servers have been manipulated or rendered inactive, such results must be declared void and inadmissible for election declaration. Chairman INEC, I have thought that you would use this wonderful opportunity to mend your reputation and character for posterity.

Your Excellency, President Muhammadu Buhari, (...) let all elections that do not pass the credibility and transparency test be cancelled and be brought back with areas where elections were disrupted for next Saturday, March 4, 2023, and BVAS and Server officials be changed. To know which stations or polling units were manipulated, let a Committee of INEC staff and representatives of the four major political parties with the Chairman of Nigerian Bar Association look into what must be done to have hitch-free elections next Saturday. Mr. President, may your plan and hope for leaving a legacy of free, fair, transparent and credible election be realised. Mr. President, please don’t let anybody say to you that it does not matter or it is the problem of INEC. On no account should you be seen as part of the collusion or compromise. (...) It will be your problem as the Chief Executive of the nation. (...) Compatriot Nigerians, please exercise patience until the wrong is righted. I strongly believe that nobody will toy with the future and fortune of Nigeria at this juncture."At the same time, Bola Tinubu's campaign team called for the arrest of their main critics, Dino, Momodu and Pastor Enenche.

Geography 

Its borders span , and it shares borders with Benin, Niger, Chad, and Cameroon (including the separatist Ambazonia) . Its coastline is at least . The main rivers are the Niger and the Benue, which converge and empty into the Niger Delta. This is one of the world's largest river deltas and the location of a large area of Central African mangroves.

Nigeria's most expansive topographical region is that of the valleys of the Niger and Benue river valleys (which merge and form a Y-shape). To the southwest of the Niger is a "rugged" highland. To the southeast of the Benue are hills and mountains, which form the Mambilla Plateau, the highest plateau in Nigeria. This plateau extends through the border with Cameroon, where the montane land is part of the Bamenda Highlands of Cameroon.

Climate 

Nigeria has a varied landscape. In the southeast stands the Obudu Plateau. Coastal plains are found in both the southwest and the southeast. Mangrove swamps are found along the coast.

The area near the border with Cameroon close to the coast is rich rainforest and part of the Cross-Sanaga-Bioko coastal forests ecoregion, an important centre for biodiversity. It is a habitat for the drill primate, which is found in the wild only in this area and across the border in Cameroon. The areas surrounding Calabar, Cross River State, also in this forest, are believed to contain the world's largest diversity of butterflies. The area of southern Nigeria between the Niger and the Cross Rivers has lost most of its forest because of development and harvesting by increased population, and has been replaced by grassland.

Everything in between the far south and the far north is savannah (insignificant tree cover, with grasses and flowers located between trees). The savannah zone's three categories are Guinean forest-savanna mosaic, Sudan savannah, and Sahel savannah. Guinean forest-savanna mosaic is plains of tall grass interrupted by trees. Sudan savannah is similar but with shorter grasses and shorter trees. Sahel savannah consists of patches of grass and sand, found in the northeast. In the dry northeast corner of the country lies Lake Chad, which Nigeria shares with Niger, Chad and Cameroon.

Hydrology 

Nigeria is divided into two main catchment areas - that of Lake Chad and that of the Niger. The Niger catchment area covers about 63% of the country. The main tributary of the Niger is the Benue, whose tributaries extend beyond Cameroon into Cameroon into Chad and the Sharie catchment area.

The Chad Basin is fed from the north-eastern quarter of Nigeria. The Bauchi Plateau forms the watershed between the Niger/Benue and Komadugu Yobe river systems. The flat plains of north-eastern Nigeria are geographically part of the Chad Basin, where the course of the El Beid River forms the border with Cameroon, from the Mandara Mountains to Lake Chad. The Komadugu Yobe river system gives rise to the internationally important Hadejia-Nguru wetlands and Ox-bow lakes around Lake Nguru in the rainy season. Other rivers of the northeast include the Ngadda and the Yedseram, both of which flow through the Sambisa swamps, thus forming a river system. The river system of the northeast is also a major river system.

In addition, Nigeria has numerous coastal rivers.

Lake Chad in the far north-east of Nigeria has had a chequered history over the last million years, drying up several times for a few thousand years and just as often growing to many times its current size. In recent decades, its surface area has been reduced considerably, which may also be due to humans taking water from the inlets to irrigate agricultural land.

Vegetation

Nigeria is covered by three types of vegetation: forests (where there is significant tree cover), savannahs (insignificant tree cover, with grasses and flowers located between trees), and montane land (least common and mainly found in the mountains near the Cameroon border. Both the forest zone and the savannah zone are divided into three parts.

Some of the forest zone's most southerly portion, especially around the Niger River and Cross River deltas, is mangrove swamp. North of this is fresh water swamp, containing different vegetation from the salt water mangrove swamps, and north of that is rain forest.

The savannah zone's three categories are divided into Guinean forest-savanna mosaic, made up of plains of tall grass which are interrupted by trees, the most common across the country; Sudan savannah, with short grasses and short trees; and Sahel savannah patches of grass and sand, found in the northeast.

Environmental issues 
Waste management including sewage treatment, the linked processes of deforestation and soil degradation, and climate change or global warming are the major environmental problems in Nigeria. Waste management presents problems in a megacity like Lagos and other major Nigerian cities which are linked with economic development, population growth and the inability of municipal councils to manage the resulting rise in industrial and domestic waste. This waste management problem is also attributable to unsustainable environmental management lifestyles of Kubwa community in the Federal Capital Territory, where there are habits of indiscriminate disposal of waste, dumping of waste along or into the canals, sewerage systems that are channels for water flows, and the like. Haphazard industrial planning, increased urbanisation, poverty and lack of competence of the municipal government are seen as the major reasons for high levels of waste pollution in major cities of the country. Some of the solutions have been disastrous to the environment, resulting in untreated waste being dumped in places where it can pollute waterways and groundwater.

In 2005, Nigeria had the highest rate of deforestation in the world, according to the Food and Agriculture Organization of the United Nations. That year, 12.2%, the equivalent of 11,089,000 hectares, had been forested in the country. Between 1990 and 2000, Nigeria lost an average of 409,700 hectares of forest every year equal to an average annual deforestation rate of 2.4%. Between 1990 and 2005, in total Nigeria lost 35.7% of its forest cover or around 6,145,000 hectares. Nigeria had a 2019 Forest Landscape Integrity Index mean score of 6.2/10, ranking it 82nd globally out of 172 countries.

In the year 2010, thousands of people were inadvertently exposed to lead-containing soil from informal gold mining within the northern state of Zamfara. While estimates vary, it is thought that upwards of 400 children died of acute lead poisoning, making this perhaps the largest lead poisoning fatality outbreak ever encountered.

Nigeria's Delta region, home of the large oil industry, experiences serious oil spills and other environmental problems, which has caused conflict in the Delta region.

Illegal oil refineries, in which local operators convert stolen crude oil into petrol and diesel, are considered particularly "dirty, dangerous and lucrative". Safety and environmental aspects are usually ignored (e.g. no sulphur is removed from the fuels produced). Refining petroleum also inevitably produces heavy oil, which is "cracked" into lighter fuel components in regular plants at great technical expense. Illegal refineries do not have these technical possibilities and "dispose" of the heavy oil where it accumulates. The lighter components of crude oil (methane to butane, isobutane), on the other hand, always mean a certain risk of explosion, which often leads to disasters at illegal plants. In 2022, Nigeria suffered 125 deaths from explosions at local, illegal refineries.

Politics

Government 
Nigeria is a federal republic modelled after the United States, with 36 states and capitol Abuja as an independent unit. The executive power is exercised by the President. The president is both head of state and head of the federal government; the president is elected by popular vote to a maximum of two four-year terms. The president's power is checked by a Senate and a House of Representatives, which are combined in a bicameral body called the National Assembly. The Senate is a 109-seat body with three members from each state and one from the capital region of Abuja; members are elected by popular vote to four-year terms. The House contains 360 seats, with the number of seats per state determined by population.

The Nigerian president is elected in a modified two-round system. To be elected in the first round, a candidate must receive a relative majority of the votes and more than 25% of the votes in at least 24 of the 36 states. If no candidate reaches this hurdle, a second round of voting takes place between the leading candidate and the next candidate who received the majority of votes in the highest number of states. Presidential candidates take a "running mate" (candidate for the vice-presidency) who is both ethnically and religiously the opposite of themselves: a Christian candidate from the South will choose a Muslim running mate from the North - and vice versa. There is no law prescribing this, yet all presidential candidates since the existence of the Fourth Republic have adhered to this rule.

State governors, like the president, are elected for four years and may serve a maximum of two terms.

Administrative divisions 

Nigeria is divided into thirty-six states and one Federal Capital Territory, which are further sub-divided into 774 local government areas. In some contexts, the states are aggregated into six geopolitical zones: North West, North East, North Central, South West, South East, and South South.

Nigeria has five cities with a population of over a million (from largest to smallest): Lagos, Kano, Ibadan, Benin City and Port Harcourt. Lagos is the largest city in Africa, with a population of over 12 million in its urban area.

The south of the country in particular is characterised by very strong urbanisation and a relatively large number of cities. According to an estimate from 2015, there are 20 cities in Nigeria with more than 500,000 inhabitants, including ten cities with a population of one million.

Political parties 

In 2022, the Senate and House of Representatives in Nigeria are dominated by three parties:

 The People's Democratic Party was the ruling party for the first 16 years of the Fourth Republic. It is striving to rehabilitate its negative image from the Jonathan era before the 2015 anti-corruption election. The leading candidate, Abubakar, seems to have to contend with maverick state governors of his own party (especially Governor Wike) rather than his political opponents in this regard.
 The All Progressives Congress is a coalition of smaller, neoliberal parties formed to oppose President Jonathan, who is seen as corrupt. The progressives brought Muhammadu Buhari to the presidency in 2015 and have been the ruling party ever since. With the generally respected ministers Fashola (Public Works) and Amaechi (Transport), the progressives can distinguish themselves as competent.
 The Labour Party has so far been an outsider in the Fourth Republic. This could change with the 2023 presidential election, as Labour frontrunner and businessman Peter Obi (in October 2022) leads significantly in the opinion polls. On National Day, 1 October 2022, the Labour election rally in Lagos reports 4 million participants. "Million marches" also took place in a dozen other cities such as Aba, Kaduna and Asaba.

Law 

The Constitution of Nigeria is the supreme law of the country. There are four distinct legal systems in Nigeria, which include English law, common law, customary law, and  Sharia law:

 English law in Nigeria consists of the collection of British laws from colonial times.
 Common law is the collection of authoritative judicial decisions in the field of civil law (so-called precedents) that have been handed down in the country concerned - in this case Nigeria. (This system is mainly found in Anglo-Saxon countries; in continental Europe, on the other hand, codified and, as far as possible, abstracted civil law predominates, as in the Code Napoléon in France).
 Customary law is derived from indigenous traditional norms and practices, including the dispute resolution meetings of pre-colonial Yoruba land secret societies and the Èkpè and Okónkò of Igboland and Ibibioland.
 Sharia law (also known as Islamic Law) used to be used only in Northern Nigeria, where Islam is the predominant religion. It is also being used in Lagos State, Oyo State, Kwara State, Ogun State, and Osun State by Muslims. Muslim penal codes are not the same in every state and they differentiate in punishment and offences according to religious affiliation (for example, alcohol consumption and distribution).

The country has a judicial branch, the highest court of which is the Supreme Court of Nigeria.

Foreign relations 

Upon gaining independence in 1960, Nigeria made African unity the centrepiece of its foreign policy. One exception to the African focus was Nigeria's close relationship developed with Israel throughout the 1960s. Israel sponsored and oversaw the construction of Nigeria's parliament buildings.

Nigeria's foreign policy was put to the test in the 1970s after the country emerged united from its civil war. It supported movements against white minority governments in Southern Africa. Nigeria backed the African National Congress by taking a committed tough line about the South African government. Nigeria was a founding member of the Organisation for African Unity (now the African Union) and has tremendous influence in West Africa and Africa on the whole. Nigeria founded regional cooperative efforts in West Africa, functioning as the standard-bearer for the Economic Community of West African States (ECOWAS) and ECOMOG (especially during the Liberia and Sierra Leone civil wars) - which are economic and military organizations, respectively.

With this Africa-centred stance, Nigeria readily sent troops to the Congo at the behest of the United Nations shortly after independence (and has maintained membership since that time). Nigeria also supported several Pan-African and pro-self government causes in the 1970s, including garnering support for Angola's MPLA, SWAPO in Namibia, and aiding opposition to the minority governments of Portuguese Mozambique, and Rhodesia. Nigeria retains membership in the Non-Aligned Movement. In late November 2006, it organized an Africa-South America Summit in Abuja to promote what some attendees termed "South-South" linkages on a variety of fronts. Nigeria is also a member of the International Criminal Court and the Commonwealth of Nations. It was temporarily expelled from the latter in 1995 when ruled by the Abacha regime.

Nigeria has remained a key player in the international oil industry since the 1970s and maintains membership in OPEC, which it joined in July 1971. Its status as a major petroleum producer figures prominently in its sometimes volatile international relations with developed countries, notably the United States, and with developing countries.

Since 2000, Chinese–Nigerian trade relations have risen exponentially. There has been an increase in total trade of over 10,384 million dollars between the two nations from 2000 to 2016. However, the structure of the Chinese–Nigerian trade relationship has become a major political issue for the Nigerian state. This is illustrated by the fact that Chinese exports account for around 80 per cent of total bilateral trade volumes. This has resulted in a serious trade imbalance, with Nigeria importing ten times more than it exports to China. Subsequently, Nigeria's economy is becoming over-reliant on cheap imports to sustain itself, resulting in a clear decline in Nigerian industry under such arrangements.

Continuing its Africa-centred foreign policy, Nigeria introduced the idea of a single currency for West Africa known as the Eco under the presumption that it would be led by the naira. But on 21 December 2019, Ivorian President Alassane Ouattara, Emmanuel Macron, and multiple other UEMOA states announced that they would merely rename the CFA franc instead of replacing the currency as originally intended. As of 2020, the Eco currency has been delayed to 2025.

Military 

The Nigerian Armed Forces are the combined military forces of Nigeria. It consists of three uniformed service branches: the Nigerian Army, Nigerian Navy, and Nigerian Air Force. The President of Nigeria functions as the commander-in-chief of the armed forces, exercising his constitutional authority through the Ministry of Defence, which is responsible for the management of the military and its personnel. The operational head of the AFN is the Chief of the Defence Staff, who is subordinate to the Nigerian Defence Minister. With a force of more than 223,000 active personnel, the Nigerian military is one of the largest uniformed combat services in Africa.

Nigeria has 143,000 troops in the armed forces (army 100,000, navy 25,000, air force 18,000) and another 80,000 personnel for "gendarmerie & paramilitary" in 2020, according to the International Institute for Strategic Studies. By comparison, Poland has 114,500 troops in armed forces and "paramilitary" and Germany 183,500, according to the same source.

Nigeria spent just under 0.4 per cent of its economic output, or US$1.6 billion, on its armed forces in 2017. For 2022, US$2.26 billion has been budgeted for the Nigerian armed forces, which is just over a third of Belgium's defence budget (US$5.99 billion).

The Chief of Defence Staff since January 2021 is General Lucky Irabor, an expert in counter-terrorism. The Defence Staff also includes the Chiefs of Army Staff Lieutenant General Faruk Yahaya, Air Staff Air Marshal Isiaka Oladayo Amao and Naval Staff Vice Admiral Awwal Zubairu Gambo.

Stability issues

Police and millitant violence 
The fight against Boko Haram, other sectarians and criminals has been accompanied by increasing police attacks. The Council on Foreign Relations' Nigeria Security Tracker counted 1,086 deaths from Boko Haram attacks and 290 deaths from police violence in the first 12 months of its establishment in May 2011. In the 12 months after October 2021, 2,193 people died from police violence and 498 from Boko Haram and ISWAP, according to the NST. The Nigerian police are notorious for vigilante justice.

The Niger Delta saw intense attacks on oil infrastructure in 2016 by militant groups such as the Movement for the Emancipation of the Niger Delta (MEND), the Niger Delta People's Volunteer Force (NDPVF), the Ijaw National Congress (INC) and the Pan Niger Delta Forum (PANDEF). In response, the new Buhari government pursued a dual strategy of repression and negotiation.

In late 2016, the Nigerian federal government resorted to the gambit of offering the militant groups a 4.5 billion naira (US$144 million) contract to guard oil infrastructure. Most accepted. The contract was renewed in August 2022, but led to fierce disputes among the above-mentioned groups over the distribution of the funds. Representatives speak of "war" - against each other. The high propensity for violence and the pettiness of the leaders, as well as the complete absence of social and environmental arguments in this dispute give rise to fears that the militant groups, despite their lofty names, have discarded responsibility for their region and ethnic groups and have moved into the realm of protection rackets and self-enrichment. In any case, the pipelines in the Niger Delta are not very effectively "guarded" - the pollution of the Niger Delta with stolen crude oil and illegally produced heavy fuel oil continued unhindered after 2016.

Boko Haram terrorism 
Boko Haram has been responsible for numerous serious attacks with thousands of casualties since mid-2010. Since then, according to the Council on Foreign Relations' Nigeria Security Tracker, over 41,600 lives have been lost to this conflict (as of October 2022). The United Nations refugee agency UNHCR counts about 1.8 million internally displaced persons and about 200,000 Nigerian refugees in neighbouring countries who have fled the fighting in north-eastern Nigeria.
The Boko Haram-affected states agreed in February 2015 to establish an 8,700-strong Multinational Joint Task Force to jointly fight Boko Haram. By October 2015, Boko Haram had been driven out of all the cities it controlled and almost all the counties in north-eastern Nigeria. In 2016, Boko Haram split and in 2022, 40,000 fighters surrendered. The splinter group ISWAP (Islamic State in West Africa) remains active.

Herder–farmer conflict 
In central Nigeria, conflicts between Muslim Hausa-Fulani herders and indigenous Christian farmers flared up again, especially in Kaduna, Plateau, Taraba and Benue states. In individual cases, these clashes have claimed several hundred lives. Conflict over land and resources is increasing due to the ongoing desertification in northern Nigeria, population growth and the generally tense economic situation.

Besides issues with terrorist groups Boko Haram and ISWAP, Christians also complain of persecution by Fulani herdsmen, who are mostly Muslim, and who have terrorised mostly Christian farmers in the Middle Belt. Christian clergy and faithful have also been targeted in cases of kidnapping by armed gangs seeking ransoms. In a speech in the European Parliament, in October 2022, bishop Wilfred Chikpa Anagbe, of the Roman Catholic Diocese of Makurdi, compared the situation of Christians in his country to "nothing short of a Jihad clothed in many names: terrorism, kidnappings, killer herdsmen, banditry, other militia groups" and called on the international community to abandon what he termed a "conspiracy of silence" on the subject.

According to Aid to the Church in Need, 4 Catholic priests were murdered in Nigeria in 2022 alone, and 23 priests and 1 seminarian were kidnapped during the year, or had been kidnapped before but remained in captivity in 2022. The majority of the kidnapped priests were later released, although three were killed and, in November 2022, three were still missing, including Fr John Bako Shekwolo, who was kidnapped in March, 2019. A further 4 nuns were kidnapped in 2022, and released soon after. The priests who were murdered were Fr Vitus Borogo, Fr Joseph Bako, Fr John Mark Cheitnum, and Fr Christopher Odia. The Catholic organisation, which has several projects in Nigeria, deplored the wave of violence, saying: "The increase in kidnappings, murders and general violence against civilians, including members of the Catholic clergy in many parts of Nigeria, is a scourge that is yet to be properly addressed by the local authorities".

During an online conference, in June 2022, bishop Matthew Man-Oso Ndagaoso, from the Roman Catholic Archdiocese of Kaduna, summed up the problems affecting Christians in the country. "For the past 14 years the nation has been grappling with Boko Haram, mostly in the northeast. While we were grappling with that, we had the issue of banditry in the northwest. And while we were grappling with this, we had the issue of kidnappings for ransom, which is becoming more widespread. And while grappling with this we have the old conflict with the Fulani herders." Regarding the murders and kidnappings of priests in Nigeria, the same bishop said, in another interview, "everybody is on edge. All of us, the clergy, the laypeople, everybody. People are afraid, and rightly so. People are traumatised, and rightly so. With this situation, nobody is safe anywhere. If you go out of your house, even in the daytime, until you come back, you are not safe".

In June 2022, a massacre took place in the St. Francis Xavier Church, in Owo. The Government blamed ISWAP for the murder of over 50 parishioners, but locals suspect Fulani herdsmen involvement.

Economy 

Nigeria's economy is the largest in Africa, the 31st-largest in the world by nominal GDP, and 30th-largest by PPP. GDP (PPP) per capita is US$9,148 (as of 2022), which is less than South Africa, Egypt or Morocco, but a little more than Ghana or Ivory Coast.

Before 1999, economic development has been hindered by years of military rule, corruption, and mismanagement. The restoration of democracy and subsequent economic reforms have successfully put Nigeria back on track towards achieving its full economic potential. After 2015, the Nigerian economy was able to diversify somewhat. Apart from oil and gas, Nigeria exports fertilisers and cement/cement board, moulded polypropylene (plastic) products, personal care products, paint, malt beverages and armoured vehicles. Nigeria is a leader in Africa as a financial market, in pharmaceuticals and in the entertainment industry. Its well-developed highway system and growing rail network also make it a logistical hub in the region. Nigeria's steel production is one sixth of the UK's steel production. Next to petroleum, the second-largest source of foreign exchange earnings for Nigeria are remittances sent home by Nigerians living abroad.

Nigeria has a lower-middle-income economy, with an abundant supply of natural resources. Its wide array of underexploited mineral resources include coal, bauxite, tantalite, gold, tin, iron ore, limestone, niobium, lead and zinc. Despite huge deposits of these natural resources, the mining industry in Nigeria is still in its infancy.

Agriculture 

In 2021, about 23.4% of Nigeria's GDP is contributed by agriculture, forestery and fishing combined. As far as cassava is concerned, Nigeria is the world's largest producer. Further major crops include beans, sesame, cashew nuts, cocoa beans, groundnuts, gum arabic, kolanut, maize (corn), melon, millet, palm kernels, palm oil, plantains, rice, rubber, sorghum, soybeans and yams. Cocoa is the leading non-oil foreign exchange earner. Rubber is the second-largest non-oil foreign exchange earner.

Before the Nigerian civil war, Nigeria was self-sufficient in food.  Agriculture used to be the principal foreign exchange earner of Nigeria. Agriculture has failed to keep pace with Nigeria's rapid population growth, and Nigeria now relies upon food imports to sustain itself.  It spends US$6.7 billion yearly for food imports, four times more than revenues from food export. The Nigerian government promoted the use of inorganic fertilizers in the 1970s.

Nigeria's rice production increased by 10% from 2017/18 to 2021/22 to 5 million tonnes a year, but could hardly keep up with the increased demand. Rice imports therefore remained constant at 2 million tonnes per year.  In August 2019, Nigeria closed its border with Benin and other neighbouring countries to stop rice smuggling into the country as part of efforts to boost local production.

Until now, Nigeria exported unhusked rice but had to import husked rice, the country's staple food. - The rice mill in Imota, near Lagos, is intended to handle the corresponding processing at home, improve the balance of trade and the labour market, and save unnecessary costs for transport and middlemen. When fully operational at the end of 2022, the plant, the largest south of the Sahara, is expected to employ 250,000 people and produce 2.5 million 50-kg bags of rice annually.

Fossil fuels 

Nigeria is the 12th largest producer of petroleum in the world, the 8th largest exporter, and has the 10th largest proven reserves. Petroleum plays a large role in the Nigerian economy, accounting for 40% of GDP and 80% of government earnings. However, agitation for better resource control in the Niger Delta, its main oil-producing region, has led to disruptions in oil production and prevents the country from exporting at 100% capacity.

In June 2013, Shell announced a strategic review of its operations in Nigeria, hinting that assets could be divested. While many international oil companies have operated there for decades, by 2014 most were making moves to divest their interests, citing a range of issues including oil theft. In August 2014, Shell said it was finalising its interests in four Nigerian oil fields.

Nigeria has a total of 159 oil fields and 1,481 wells in operation according to the Department of Petroleum Resources. The most productive region of the nation is the coastal Niger Delta Basin in the Niger Delta or "south-south" region which encompasses 78 of the 159 oil fields. Most of Nigeria's oil fields are small and scattered, and as of 1990, these small fields accounted for 62.1% of all Nigerian production. This contrasts with the sixteen largest fields which produced 37.9% of Nigeria's petroleum at that time. Petrol was Nigeria's main import commodity until 2021, accounting for 24% of import volume.

The supply of natural gas to Europe, threatened by the Ukraine war, is pushing projects to transport Nigerian natural gas via pipelines to Morocco or Algeria. As of May 2022, however, there are no results on this yet.

Manufacturing and technology 

Nigeria has a manufacturing industry that includes leather and textiles (centred in Kano, Abeokuta, Onitsha, and Lagos), plastics and processed food. Ogun is considered to be Nigeria's current industrial hub, as most factories are located in Ogun and more companies are moving there, followed by Lagos. The city of Aba in the south-eastern part of the country is well known for handicrafts and shoes, known as "Aba made". Nigeria has a market of 720,000 cars per year, but less than 20% of these are produced domestically.

In 2016 (the last year from which data is available), Nigeria was the leading cement producer south of the Sahara, ahead of South Africa. Aliko Dangote, Nigeria's richest inhabitant, based his wealth on cement production. According to its own information, the Ajaokuta Steel Company Limited produces 1.3 million tonnes of steel per year. This would be equivalent to one-sixth of the UK's steel production in 2021. However, steel plants in Katsina, Jos and Osogbo no longer appear to be active.

In June 2019, Nigeria EduSat-1 was deployed from the International Space Station. It is the first satellite that was built in Nigeria, which followed many other Nigerian satellites that was built by other countries. In 2021, Nigeria hosts about 60 percent of the pharmaceutical production capacity in Africa, the larger pharmaceutical companies are located in Lagos. The pharmaceutical producer with the most employees in Nigeria is Emzor Pharmaceutical Industries Ltd. Nigeria has a few electronic manufacturers like Zinox, the first branded Nigerian computer, and manufacturers of electronic gadgets such as tablet PCs. As of January 2022, Nigeria is the host 5 out of the 7 unicorn companies in Africa.

Services 

Nigeria has a highly developed financial services sector, with a mix of local and international banks, asset management companies, brokerage houses, insurance companies and brokers, private equity funds and investment banks.

Due to Nigeria's location in the centre of Africa, transport plays a major role in the national service sector. The government under Buhari initiated improvements to the infrastructure after 2015. Extensive road repairs and new construction have been carried out gradually as states in particular spend their share of increased government allocations. Representative of these improvements is the Second Niger Bridge near Onitsha, which was largely completed in 2022.

Nigerian telecommunications market is one of the fastest-growing in the world, with major emerging market operators (like MTN, 9mobile, Airtel and Globacom) basing their largest and most profitable centres in the country. Nigeria's ICT sector has experienced a lot of growth, representing 10% of the nation's GDP in 2018 as compared to just 1% in 2001. Lagos is regarded as one of the largest technology hubs in Africa with its thriving tech ecosystem. According to a survey by the GSM Association, 92% of adult Nigerian men and 88% of women owned a mobile phone. Using various measures including but not limited to Illegal arrest, taking down of websites, passport seizures, and restricted access to bank accounts, the Nigerian government is punishing citizens for expressing themselves on the internet and working to stifle internet freedom.

Tourism 

Tourism in Nigeria centres largely on events, because of the country's ample amount of ethnic groups, but also includes rain forests, savannah, waterfalls, and other natural attractions.
Abuja is home to several parks and green areas. The largest, Millennium Park, was designed by architect Manfredi Nicoletti and officially opened in December 2003. After the re-modernization project achieved by the administration of Governor Raji Babatunde Fashola, Lagos is gradually becoming a major tourist destination. Lagos is currently taking steps to become a global city. The 2009 Eyo carnival (a yearly festival originating from Iperu Remo, Ogun State) was a step toward world city status. Currently, Lagos is primarily known as a business-oriented and fast-paced community. Lagos has become an important location for African and black cultural identity.

Lagos has sandy beaches by the Atlantic Ocean, including Elegushi Beach and Alpha Beach. Lagos also has many private beach resorts including Inagbe Grand Beach Resort and several others in the outskirts. Lagos has a variety of hotels ranging from three-star to five-star hotels, with a mixture of local hotels such as Eko Hotels and Suites, Federal Palace Hotel and franchises of multinational chains such as Intercontinental Hotel, Sheraton, and Four Points by Sheraton. Other places of interest include the Tafawa Balewa Square, Festac town, The Nike Art Gallery, Freedom Park, and the Cathedral Church of Christ.

Energy 

Nigeria's primary energy consumption was about 108 Mtoe in 2011. Most of the energy comes from traditional biomass and waste, which account for 83% of total primary production. The rest is from fossil fuels (16%) and hydropower (1%). Since independence, Nigeria has tried to develop a domestic nuclear industry for energy. Since 2004, Nigeria has had a Chinese-origin research reactor at Ahmadu Bello University and has sought the support of the International Atomic Energy Agency to develop plans for up to 4,000 MWe of nuclear capacity by 2027 according to the National Program for the Deployment of Nuclear Power for Generation of Electricity. In 2007, President Umaru Yar'Adua urged the country to embrace nuclear power to meet its growing energy needs. In 2017, Nigeria signed the UN treaty on the Prohibition of Nuclear Weapons.

In April 2015, Nigeria began talks with Russia's state-owned Rosatom to collaborate on the design, construction and operation of four nuclear power plants by 2035, the first of which will be in operation by 2025. In June 2015, Nigeria selected two sites for the planned construction of the nuclear plants. Neither the Nigerian government nor Rosatom would disclose the specific locations of the sites, but it is believed that the nuclear plants will be sited in Akwa Ibom State and Kogi State. The sites are planned to house two plants each. In 2017 agreements were signed for the construction of the Itu nuclear power plant.

Infrastructure

Roads 

Nigeria has the largest road network in West Africa. It covers about 200,000 km, of which 60,000 km are asphalted. Nigeria's roads and highways handle 90% of all passenger and freight traffic. It contributes N2.4trn ($6.4bn) to GDP in 2020.

35,000 km of the road network fall under the jurisdiction of the federal government. Under the second Buhari administration, the budget for maintenance and paving of these 35,000 km was almost doubled in regular increments from 295 billion naira ($819 million) in 2018 to 563 billion naira ($1.3 billion) in 2022. Responsible for this budget (as of September 2022) is Minister Fashola, one of Nigeria's most respected politicians. Under him, the motorway links of important economic centres such as Lagos-Ibadan, Lagos-Badagry and Enugu-Onitsha have been renovated.

The rest of the road network is a state matter and therefore in very different shape, depending on which state you are in. Surprisingly, economically strong states such as Lagos, Anambra and Rivers receive particularly poor evaluations. Most roads were built in the 1980s and early 1990s. Poor maintenance and inferior materials have worsened the condition of the roads. Travelling is very difficult. Especially during the rainy season, the use of secondary roads is sometimes almost impossible due to potholes. Road bandits often take advantage of this situation for their criminal purposes.

Railways 
The railways have undergone a massive revamping with projects such as the Lagos-Kano Standard Gauge Railway being completed connecting northern cities of Kano, Kaduna, Abuja, Ibadan and Lagos.

Air traffic 

The state-owned airline Nigeria Airways was over-indebted in 2003 and was bought by the British Virgin Group; since 28 June 2005 it has flown under the name Virgin Nigeria Airways. At the end of 2008, the Virgin Group announced its withdrawal from the airline, so that since September 2009 the airline has been operating as Nigerian Eagle Airlines. The largest airline in Nigeria is now Arik Air, founded in 2004. It has a fleet of over 20 aircraft and serves national and international destinations.

The Nigerian aviation industry generated 198.62 billion naira (€400 million) in 2019, representing a contribution of 0.14 per cent to GDP. It was the fastest growing sector of the Nigerian economy in 2019. Passenger traffic increased from 9,358,166 in 2020 to 15,886,955 in 2021, a significant increase of over 69 per cent. Aircraft movements increased by more than 46 per cent from 2020 to 2021. Total freight volumes were 191 tonnes in 2020 but increased to 391 tonnes in 2021. In December 2021, the Anambra International Cargo Airport started its operation. In April 2022, the second terminal of the Murtala Muhammed International Airport has been inaugurated. It will increase the capacity of the airport to 14 million passengers per year.

There are 54 airports in Nigeria; the principal airports are
 Murtala Muhammed International Airport in Lagos,
 Nnamdi Azikiwe International Airport in Abuja,
 Mallam Aminu Kano International Airport in Kano,
 Akanu Ibiam International Airport in Enugu and
 Port Harcourt International Airport in Port Harcourt.

Demographics 

Around 42.5% of the population were 14 years or younger, 19.6% were aged 15–24, 30.7% were aged 25–54, 4.0% were aged 55–64, and 3.1% were aged 65 years or older. The median age in 2017 was 18.4 years. Nigeria is the world's sixth-most populous country. The birth rate is 35.2-births/1,000 population and the death rate is 9.6 deaths/1,000 population as of 2017, while the total fertility rate is 5.07 children born/woman. Nigeria's population increased by 57 million from 1990 to 2008, a 60% growth rate in less than two decades. Nigeria is the most populous country in Africa and accounts for about 17% of the continent's total population as of 2017; however, exactly how populous is a subject of speculation.

Millions of Nigerians have emigrated during times of economic hardship, primarily to Europe, North America and Australia. It is estimated that over a million Nigerians have emigrated to the United States and constitute the Nigerian American populace. Individuals in many such Diasporic communities have joined the "Egbe Omo Yoruba" society, a national association of Yoruba descendants in North America.   Nigeria's largest city is Lagos. Lagos has grown from about 300,000 in 1950 to an estimated 13.4 million in 2017.

Nigeria has more than 250 ethnic groups, with varying languages and customs, creating a country of rich ethnic diversity. The three largest ethnic groups are the Hausa, Yoruba and Igbo, together accounting for more than 60% of the population, while the Edo, Ijaw, Fulɓe, Kanuri, Urhobo-Isoko, Ibibio, Ebira, Nupe, Gbagyi, Jukun, Igala, Idoma, Ogoni and Tiv account for between 35 and 40%; other minorities make up the remaining 5%. The Middle Belt of Nigeria is known for its diversity of ethnic groups, including the Atyap, Berom, Goemai, Igala, Kofyar, Pyem, and Tiv. There are small minorities of British, American, Indian, Chinese (est. 50,000), white Zimbabwean, Japanese, Greek, Syrian and Lebanese immigrants. Immigrants also include those from other West African or East African nations.

Languages 

525 languages have been spoken in Nigeria; eight of them are now extinct. In some areas of Nigeria, ethnic groups speak more than one language. The official language of Nigeria, English, was chosen to facilitate the cultural and linguistic unity of the country, owing to the influence of British colonisation which ended in 1960. Many French speakers from surrounding countries have influenced the English spoken in the border regions of Nigeria and some Nigerian citizens have become fluent enough in French to work in the surrounding countries. The French spoken in Nigeria may be mixed with some native languages and English.

The major languages spoken in Nigeria represent three major families of languages of Africa: the majority are Niger-Congo languages, such as Igbo, Yoruba, Ibibio, Ijaw, Fulfulde, Ogoni, and Edo. Kanuri, spoken in the northeast, primarily in Borno and Yobe State, is part of the Nilo-Saharan family, and Hausa is an Afroasiatic language. Even though most ethnic groups prefer to communicate in their languages, English as the official language is widely used for education, business transactions and official purposes. English as a first language is used by only a small minority of the country's urban elite, and it is not spoken at all in some rural areas. Hausa is the most widely spoken of the three main languages spoken in Nigeria.

With the majority of Nigeria's populace in the rural areas, the major languages of communication in the country remain indigenous languages. Some of the largest of these, notably Yoruba and Igbo, have derived standardised languages from several different dialects and are widely spoken by those ethnic groups. Nigerian Pidgin English, often known simply as "Pidgin" or "Broken" (Broken English), is also a popular lingua franca, though with varying regional influences on dialect and slang. The pidgin English or Nigerian English is widely spoken within the Niger Delta Region.

Religion 

Nigeria is a religiously diverse society, with Islam and Christianity being the most widely professed religions. Nigerians are nearly equally divided into Muslims and Christians, with a tiny minority of adherents of traditional African religions and other religions. The Christian share of Nigeria's population is on the decline because of the lower fertility rate compared to Muslims in the country. As in other parts of Africa where Islam and Christianity are dominant, religious syncretism with the traditional African religions is common.

A 2012 report on religion and public life by the Pew Research Center stated that in 2010, 49.3 per cent of Nigeria's population was Christian, 48.8 per cent was Muslim, and 1.9 per cent were followers of indigenous and other religions or unaffiliated. However, in a report released by Pew Research Center in 2015, the Muslim population was estimated to be 50%, and by 2060, according to the report, Muslims will account for about 60% of the country. The 2010 census of Association of Religion Data Archives has also reported that 48.8% of the total population was Christian, slightly larger than the Muslim population of 43.4%, while 7.5% were members of other religions. However, these estimates should be taken with caution because sample data is mostly collected from major urban areas in the south, which are predominantly Christian.

Islam dominates North-Western Nigeria (Hausa, Fulani and others), with 99% Muslim, and Northern Eastern Nigeria (Kanuri, Fulani and other groups). In the west, the Yoruba tribe is predominantly of mixed Muslim and Christian backgrounds, with a few adherents of traditional religions. Protestant and locally cultivated Christianity are widely practised in Western areas, while Roman Catholicism is a more prominent Christian feature of South Eastern Nigeria. Both Roman Catholicism and Protestantism are observed in the Ibibio, Efik, Ijo and Ogoni lands of the south. The Igbos (predominant in the east) and the Ibibio (south) are 98% Christian, with 2% practising traditional religions. The middle belt of Nigeria contains the largest number of minority ethnic groups in Nigeria, who were found to be mostly Christians and members of traditional religions, with a small proportion of Muslims.

Conflicts 
Since mid-2010, Boko Haram has terrorised northeastern Nigeria. In the following 12 years, according to the Council on Foreign Relations' "Nigeria Security Tracker", over 41,600 people died because of this group (as of October 2022). Millions of people fled south or to the big cities, such as Maiduguri. Boko Haram also attacked churches.

However, the formula "Muslims against Christians" falls short. Despite Boko Haram's murderous hostility towards Christians, most of their victims have always been Muslims, not least because the insurgency is taking place in a predominantly Muslim part of the country, mainly Borno state in the far north-east of Nigeria. The killing of such a large number of Muslims by Boko Haram, based on a broad definition of apostasy, is believed to have been one of the reasons for the group's split in 2016. Nigeria Security Tracker (NST) data shows (as of March 2022) that Boko Haram attacks on churches have decreased over time, while attacks on mosques have increased. The lower number of Christian fatalities at the hands of Boko Haram probably reflects the fact that most of them have fled.

Boko Haram has been in decline since at least March 2022. 40,000 of its fighters surrendered in 2022. Since 2021, the Islamic State in West Africa (ISWAP) appears more dominant than Boko Haram. ISWAP is, for example, credited with the church attack in Owo at Pentecost 2022.

Health 

Health care delivery in Nigeria is a concurrent responsibility of the three tiers of government in the country, and the private sector. Nigeria has been reorganising its health system since the Bamako Initiative of 1987, which formally promoted community-based methods of increasing accessibility of drugs and health care services to the population, in part by implementing user fees. The new strategy dramatically increased accessibility through community-based health care reform, resulting in more efficient and equitable provision of services. A comprehensive approach strategy was extended to all areas of health care, with subsequent improvement in the health care indicators and improvement in health care efficiency and cost.

HIV/AIDS rate in Nigeria is much lower compared to the other African nations such as Botswana or South Africa whose prevalence (percentage) rates are in the double digits. , the HIV prevalence rate among adults ages 15–49 was 1.5 per cent. The life expectancy in Nigeria is 54.7 years on average, and 71% and 39% of the population have access to improved water sources and improved sanitation, respectively. , the infant mortality is 74.2 deaths per 1,000 live births.

In 2012, a new bone marrow donor program was launched by the University of Nigeria to help people with leukaemia, lymphoma, or sickle cell disease to find a compatible donor for a life-saving bone marrow transplant, which cures them of their conditions. Nigeria became the second African country to have successfully carried out this surgery. In the 2014 Ebola outbreak, Nigeria was the first country to effectively contain and eliminate the Ebola threat that was ravaging three other countries in the West African region; the unique method of contact tracing employed by Nigeria became an effective method later used by countries such as the United States when Ebola threats were discovered.

The Nigerian health care system is continuously faced with a shortage of doctors known as "brain drain", because of emigration by skilled Nigerian doctors to North America and Europe. In 1995, an estimated 21,000 Nigerian doctors were practising in the United States alone, which is about the same as the number of doctors working in the Nigerian public service. Retaining these expensively trained professionals has been identified as one of the goals of the government.

Education 

Education in Nigeria is overseen by the Ministry of Education. Local authorities take responsibility for implementing policy for state-controlled public education and state schools at a regional level. The education system is divided into kindergarten, primary education, secondary education and tertiary education. After the 1970s oil boom, tertiary education was improved so it would reach every subregion of Nigeria. 68% of the Nigerian population is literate, and the rate for men (75.7%) is higher than that for women (60.6%).

Nigeria provides free, government-supported education, but attendance is not compulsory at any level, and certain groups, such as nomads and the handicapped, are under-served. The education system consists of six years of primary school, three years of junior secondary school, three years of senior secondary school, and four, five or six years of university education leading to a bachelor's degree. The government has majority control of university education. Tertiary education in Nigeria consists of universities (public and private), polytechnics, monotechnics, and colleges of education. The country has a total of 138 universities, with 40 federally owned, 39 state-owned, and 59 privately owned. Nigeria was ranked 118th in the Global Innovation Index in 2021, down from 114th in 2019.

Crime 

Nigeria is home to a substantial network of organised crime, active especially in drug trafficking, shipping heroin from Asian countries to Europe and America; and cocaine from South America to Europe and South Africa.

Various Nigerian confraternities or student "campus cults" are active in both organised crime and political violence as well as providing a network of corruption within Nigeria. As confraternities have extensive connections with political and military figures, they offer excellent alumni networking opportunities. The Supreme Vikings Confraternity, for example, boasts that twelve members of the Rivers State House of Assembly are cult members. In lower levels of society, there are the "area boys", organised gangs mostly active in Lagos who specialise in a mugging and small-scale drug dealing. Gang violence in Lagos resulted in 273 civilians and 84 policemen being killed from August 2000 to May 2001.

There is some piracy in the Gulf of Guinea, with attacks directed at all types of vessels. Consistent with the rise of Nigeria as an increasingly dangerous hot spot, 28 of the 30 seafarers kidnapped globally between January and June 2013 were in Nigeria.

Internationally, Nigeria is infamous for a form of bank fraud dubbed 419, a type of advance-fee scam (named after Section 419 of the Nigerian Penal Code) along with the "Nigerian scam", a form of confidence trick practised by individuals and criminal syndicates. These scams involve a complicit Nigerian bank (the laws being set up loosely to allow it) and a scammer who claims to have money he needs to obtain from that bank. The victim is talked into exchanging bank account information on the premise that the money will be transferred to them and they will get to keep a cut. In reality, money is taken out instead, or large fees (which seem small in comparison with the imaginary wealth to be gained) are deducted. In 2003, the Nigerian Economic and Financial Crimes Commission was created to combat this and other forms of organised financial crime, and in some cases, it has succeeded in bringing the crime bosses to justice and even managing to return the stolen money to victims.

Poverty 

According to the International Monetary Fund, 32% of Nigeria's population lives in extreme poverty (as of 2017), living on less than US$2.15 a day. The World Bank stated in March 2022 that the number of poor Nigerians had increased by 5 million to 95.1 million during the Covid period. Accordingly, 40% of Nigerians live below the poverty line of US$1.90 as handled by the World Bank.

The threshold amounts used internationally by the IMF and the World Bank do not take into account the local purchasing power of a US dollar. The methodology is therefore not without controversy. Despite the undoubted existence of slums in Nigeria, for example, the fact that 92% of men and 88% of women in Nigeria own a mobile phone is difficult to reconcile with the poverty percentages published by the IMF and the World Bank.

Human rights 

Nigeria's human rights record remains poor. According to the U.S. Department of State, the most significant human rights problems are the use of excessive force by security forces, impunity for abuses by security forces, arbitrary arrests, prolonged pretrial detention, judicial corruption and executive influence on the judiciary, rape, torture and other cruel, inhuman or degrading treatment of prisoners, detainees and suspects; harsh and life‑threatening prison and detention centre conditions; human trafficking for prostitution and forced labour, societal violence and vigilante killings, child labour, child abuse and child sexual exploitation, domestic violence, discrimination based on ethnicity, region and religion.

Nigeria is a state party of the Convention on the Elimination of All Forms of Discrimination Against Women It also has signed the Maputo Protocol, an international treaty on women's rights, and the African Union Women's Rights Framework. Discrimination based on sex is a significant human rights issue. Forced marriages are common. Child marriage remains common in Northern Nigeria; 39% of girls are married before age 15, although the Marriage Rights Act banning marriage of girls below 18 years old was introduced on a federal level in 2008. There is rampant polygamy in Northern Nigeria. Submission of the wife to her husband and domestic violence are common. Women have fewer land rights. Maternal mortality was at 814 per 100,000 live births in 2015. Female genital mutilation is common, although a ban was implemented in 2015. In Nigeria, at least half a million suffer from vaginal fistula, largely as a result of lack of medical care. Early marriages can result in the fistula.

Women face a large amount of inequality politically in Nigeria, being subjugated to a bias that is sexist and reinforced by socio-cultural, economic and oppressive ways. Women throughout the country were only politically emancipated in 1979. Yet husbands continue to dictate the votes for many women in Nigeria, which upholds the patriarchal system. Most workers in the informal sector are women. Women's representation in government since independence from Britain is very poor. Women have been reduced to sideline roles in appointive posts throughout all levels of government and still make up a tiny minority of elected officials. But nowadays with more education available to the public, Nigerian women are taking steps to have more active roles in the public, and with the help of different initiatives, more businesses are being started by women.

Under the Shari'a penal code that applies to Muslims in twelve northern states, offences such as alcohol consumption, homosexuality, infidelity and theft carry harsh sentences, including amputation, lashing, stoning and long prison terms. According to a 2013 survey by the Pew Research Center, 98% of Nigerians believe homosexuality should not be accepted by society. In the last 23 years (as of September 2022), university workers in Nigeria have gone on strike 17 times, or for 57 months. As a result, the 2022 summer semester was cancelled nationwide.

Culture

Literature 

Most Nigerian literature is written in English, partly because this language is understood by most Nigerians. Literature in the Yoruba, Hausa and Igbo languages (the three most populous peoples in Nigeria) does exist, however, and in the case of the Hausa, for example, can look back on a centuries-old tradition. With Wole Soyinka, Nigeria can present a Nobel Prize winner for literature. Chinua Achebe won the prestigious Booker Prize in 2007 and Ben Okri in 1991. Achebe also won the Peace Award of the German Book Trade in 2002.

Music 

Many late 20th-century musicians such as Fela Kuti have famously fused cultural elements of various indigenous music with African-American jazz and soul to form Afrobeat which has in turn influenced hip hop music. JuJu music, which is percussion music fused with traditional music from the Yoruba nation and made famous by King Sunny Adé, is from Nigeria. Fuji music, a Yoruba percussion style, was created and popularised by Mr Fuji, Alhaji Sikiru Ayinde Barrister.

Afan Music was invented and popularised by the Ewu-born poet and musician Umuobuarie Igberaese. Kennis Music originality started the Afrobeats movement in Nigeria. Kennis Music is widely credited for the evolution of the Nigerian music scene and the rise of many major players. In November 2008, Nigeria's music scene (and that of Africa) received international attention when MTV hosted the continent's first African music awards show in Abuja. over a decade later and Afro beats has widely taken over with artist like Davido, Wizkid and Burna Boy ranked amongst the biggest in the world.

Cinema 

The Nigerian film industry is known as Nollywood (a blend of "Nigeria" and "Hollywood") and is now the second-largest producer of movies in the world, having surpassed Hollywood. Only India's Bollywood is larger. Nigerian film studios are based in Lagos, Kano, and Enugu, and form a major portion of the local economy of these cities. Nigerian Cinema Is Africa's Largest Movie Industry In Terms Of Both Value And The Number Of Movies Produced Per Year. Although Nigerian films have been produced since the 1960s, the country's film industry has been aided by the rise of affordable digital filming and editing technologies.

The 2009 thriller film The Figurine heightened the media attention towards the New Nigerian Cinema revolution. The film was a critical and commercial success in Nigeria, and it was also screened in international film festivals. The 2010 film Ijé by Chineze Anyaene, overtook The Figurine to become the highest-grossing Nigerian film; a record it held for four years until it was overtaken in 2014 by Half of a Yellow Sun (2013). By 2016, this record was held by The Wedding Party, a film by Kemi Adetiba.

By the end of 2013, the film industry reportedly hit a record-breaking revenue of ₦1.72 trillion (US$4.1 billion). As of 2014, the industry was worth ₦853.9 billion (US$5.1 billion), making it the third most valuable film industry in the world behind the United States and India. It contributed about 1.4% to Nigeria's economy; this was attributed to the increase in the number of quality films produced and more formal distribution methods.

T.B. Joshua's Emmanuel TV, originating from Nigeria, is one of the most viewed television stations across Africa.

Festival 

There are many festivals in Nigeria, some of which date to the period before the arrival of the major religions in this ethnically and culturally diverse society. The main Muslim and Christian festivals are often celebrated in ways that are unique to Nigeria or unique to the people of a locality. The Nigerian Tourism Development Corporation has been working with the states to upgrade the traditional festivals, which may become important sources of tourism revenue.

Cuisine 
Nigerian cuisine, like West African cuisine in general, is known for its richness and variety. Many different spices, herbs, and flavourings are used in conjunction with palm oil or groundnut oil to create deeply flavoured sauces and soups often made very hot with chilli peppers. Nigerian feasts are colourful and lavish, while aromatic market and roadside snacks cooked on barbecues or fried in oil are plentiful and varied. Suya is usually sold in urban areas especially during night-time.

Fashion 

The fashion industry in Nigeria contributes significantly to the country's economics. Casual attire is commonly worn but formal and traditional styles are also worn depending on the occasion. Nigeria is known not only for its fashionable textiles and garments, but also for its fashion designers who have increasingly gained international recognition. Euromonitor estimates the Sub-Saharan fashion market to be worth $31 billion, with Nigeria accounting for 15% of these $31 billion. Nigeria is not only known for their many fashion textiles and garment pieces that are secret to their culture. They also outputted many fashion designers who have develop many techniques and business along the way.

Sports 

Football is largely considered Nigeria's national sport, and the country has its own Premier League of football. Nigeria's national football team, known as the "Super Eagles", has made the World Cup on six occasions 1994, 1998, 2002, 2010, 2014, and 2018. In April 1994, the Super Eagles ranked 5th in the FIFA World Rankings, the highest-ranking achieved by an African football team. They won the African Cup of Nations in 1980, 1994, and 2013, and have also hosted the U-17 & U-20 World Cup. They won the gold medal for football in the 1996 Summer Olympics (in which they beat Argentina) becoming the first African football team to win gold in Olympic football.

Nigeria is also involved in other sports such as basketball, cricket and track and field. Boxing is also an important sport in Nigeria;. Nigeria's national basketball team made the headlines internationally when it became the first African team to beat the United States men's national team. In earlier years, Nigeria qualified for the 2012 Summer Olympics as it beat heavily favoured world elite teams such as Greece and Lithuania. Nigeria has been home to numerous internationally recognised basketball players in the world's top leagues in America, Europe and Asia. These players include Basketball Hall of Famer Hakeem Olajuwon, and later players in the NBA. The Nigerian Premier League has become one of the biggest and most-watched basketball competitions in Africa. The games have aired on Kwese TV and have averaged a viewership of over a million people.

Nigeria made history by qualifying the first bobsled team for the Winter Olympics from Africa when their women's two-person team qualified for the bobsled competition at the XXIII Olympic Winter Games. In the early 1990s, Scrabble was made an official sport in Nigeria. By the end of 2017, there were around 4,000 players in more than 100 clubs in the country.  In 2018, the Nigerian Curling Federation was established to introduce a new sport to the country with the hope of getting the game to be a part of the curriculum at the elementary, high school, and university levels respectively. At the 2019 World Mixed Doubles Curling Championship in Norway, Nigeria won their first international match beating France 8–5.

Nigeria featured women's and men's national teams in beach volleyball that competed at the 2018–2020 CAVB Beach Volleyball Continental Cup. The country's U21 national teams qualified for the 2019 FIVB Beach Volleyball U21 World Championships.

See also 

 Index of Nigeria-related articles
 Outline of Nigeria

Notes

References

Further reading 

 
 Dibua, Jeremiah I. Modernization and the crisis of development in Africa: the Nigerian experience (Routledge, 2017).
Ekundare, Olufemi R. An Economic History of Nigeria 1860-1960 (Methuen & Co Ltd, 1973).
 Falola, Toyin; and Adam Paddock. Environment and Economics in Nigeria (2012).
 Falola, Toyin and Ann Genova. Historical Dictionary of Nigeria (Scarecrow Press, 2009)
 Falola, Toyin, and Matthew M. Heaton. A History of Nigeria (2008)
 Shillington, Kevin. Encyclopedia of African History. (U of Michigan Press, 2005) p. 1401.
 Metz, Helen Chapin, ed. Nigeria: a country study (U.S. Library of Congress. Federal Research Division, 1992) online free, comprehensive historical and current coverage; not copyright.
Jones, Cunliffe-Peter. My Nigeria Five Decades of Independence. (Palgrave Macmillan, 2010).
Achebe, Chinua. The trouble with Nigeria. (Fourth Dimension, 1983)

External links 

 
 
 
 Know More about Nigeria
 Nigeria. The World Factbook. Central Intelligence Agency.

 
Republics in the Commonwealth of Nations
Developing 8 Countries member states
Economic Community of West African States
English-speaking countries and territories
Federal republics
G15 nations
Member states of OPEC
Member states of the African Union
Member states of the Commonwealth of Nations
Member states of the Organisation of Islamic Cooperation
Member states of the United Nations
States and territories established in 1960
West African countries
1960 establishments in Nigeria
Countries in Africa
1960 establishments in Africa
Former British colonies and protectorates in Africa